The Pacific Steam Navigation Company was a British commercial shipping company that operated along the Pacific coast of South America, and was the first to use steam ships for commercial traffic in the Pacific Ocean.

History

The company  was founded by William Wheelwright in London in 1838 and began operations in 1840 when two steam ships Chile and Peru were commissioned to carry mail. Early ports of call were Valparaíso, Coquimbo, Huasco, Copiapó, Cobija, Iquique, Arica, Islay, Pisco and Callao. In 1846 the company expanded its routes to include Huanchaco, Lambayeque, Paita, Guayaquil, Buenaventura and Panama City.

In 1852 the company gained a contract for British Government mail to posts in western South America. Two direct routes were also established - Liverpool to Callao in 1868 and London to Sydney in 1877. In common with its contemporaries, the company lost a number of ships in its early decades.

In 1905 the company sold its London – Sydney route to the Royal Mail Steam Packet Company, which bought the entire company in 1910. Pacific Steam continued to lose ships at sea. In 1902  was wrecked in a gale, killing 63 people. In 1907 
 met a similar fate, killing 45 people. In 1911  ran aground, killing 60 people.

In the First World War ten of the company's ships were sunk, but at the relatively light cost of only 15 lives. In the Second World War a German submarine torpedoed a Pacific Steam passenger liner, sinking her and killing 106 people.

RMSP's name and routes were retained until Furness Withy bought Royal Mail in 1965. Following the purchase the separate Pacific Steam Navigation Company structure was abolished and the vessels rebranded, effectively signalling the end of the Company.

In 1919, the company began a house magazine called Sea Breezes. The journal outlived the company and it still exists, with a focus on international shipping matters.

Routes

See also
MV Reina del Pacifico

References

External links
 RMS Oroya Passenger List of the Pacific Line (PSNC) - 22 January 1925 GG Archives

Transport companies established in 1838
Defunct companies of Chile
Defunct shipping companies of the United Kingdom
Multinational companies
Shipping companies of Peru
Shipping companies of Chile
Shipping companies of England
1838 establishments in the United Kingdom
British companies established in 1838